M. P. Ahammed (born 1 November 1957) is an Indian businessman and the chair of Malabar Group of Companies. He is also the founder of Malabar Gold ad Diamonds, one of world's largest retail jewellery groups.

According to the Economic Times, in 2012 Malabar Gold and Diamonds made a turnover of ₹120 billion, and by the end of 2013, the company's turnover touched ₹h220 billion.

Early life
M. P. Ahammed was born to Mammad Kutty Hajee and Fathima. At the age of 17, he started his first business venture of agro products. In 1981, at the age of 24, he started a trading business of spices and copra.

Career

Malabar Gold and Diamonds
M. P. Ahammed is the founder of Malabar Gold and Diamonds, a BIS certified Indian jewellery group based in Kozhikode, Kerala, India. The company was established in the year 1993 with a revenue of ₹5 million. He is also the company's current chairman. Malabar group has 250 showrooms across 9 countries at present. The group is also involved with Green Thumb, a brand that produces organic farming products and Eham Digitals, a home appliances company.

Malabar Developers
In 2005, marking the launch of Malabar Group of Companies’ real estate division, the first commercial building of Malabar Developers was launched at Kozhikode. In 2014, Malabar Developers initiated the plans for Mall of Travancore, which was designed to be a shopping mall of global standards. With many environment-friendly initiatives, it is also the first green Mall in India. The foundation stone for Mall of Travancore was laid by the then Chief Minister of Kerala Oommen Chandy.

Eham Digital
Eham Digital is a retail business owned by Malabar Group and Nikshan Electronics that produces electronics, home appliances and gadgets. Eham Digital was launched in Kozhikode with largest showroom of its kind in Kerala.

Personal life
M. P. Ahammed is married to K. P. Subaida, and together they have two children. His son Shamlal Ahammed is the company's managing director of International Operations.

References

1957 births
Indian businesspeople
Indian jewellers
Living people
Indian billionaires